Baharabad may refer to:
 Baharabad, Azerbaijan
 Baharabad, Lorestan, Iran
 Baharabad, Mazandaran, Iran
 Baharabad, alternate name of Bahaabad, Semnan, Iran
 Chaqa Bahram, Iran
 Baharabad, West Azerbaijan